The 6th Ryder Cup Matches were held 29–30 June 1937 at the Southport and Ainsdale Golf Club in Southport, England. The United States team won the competition by a score of 8 to 4 points.  It was the first time that the host team lost the competition and the second of seven consecutive wins for the U.S. side.  The course had hosted the event four years earlier in 1933, Britain's last win until 1957.

Due to World War II, this was the final Ryder Cup for a full decade; the series resumed in 1947 in the U.S. at Portland, Oregon.

Format
The Ryder Cup is a match play event, with each match worth one point.  From 1927 through 1959, the format consisted of 4 foursome (alternate shot) matches on the first day and 8 singles matches on the second day, for a total of 12 points.  Therefore,  points were required to win the Cup.  All matches were played to a maximum of 36 holes.

Teams
Source:

From the start of 1937, Henry Cotton became professional to the Ashridge Golf Club and hence became eligible for selection for the British team. He had missed the 1931 edition because of a dispute and was not eligible in 1933 and 1935 because he was employed in Belgium. In April 1937, it was announced that, as in 1935, a selection committee of six would choose the Great Britain team for the 1937 Ryder Cup. In July, the team of ten was selected (as below). Charles Whitcombe was again chosen as the captain.

Tuesday's foursome matches

18 hole scores: Padgham/Cotton v Dudley/Nelson: all square, Lacey/Cox: 1 up, Whitcombe/Rees v Sarazen/Shute: all square, Alliss/Burton: 3 up.

Wednesday's singles matches

18 hole scores: Guldahl: 6 up, King v Shute: all square, Rees: 1 up, Cotton: 2 up, Alliss: 1 up, Snead: 2 up, Dudley: 1 up, Picard: 1 up.

Individual player records
Each entry refers to the win–loss–half record of the player.

Source:

Great Britain

United States

Horton Smith did not play in any matches.

References

External links

PGA of America: 1937 Ryder Cup
About.com: 1937 Ryder Cup

Ryder Cup
Golf tournaments in England
Sport in Southport
Ryder Cup
Ryder Cup
Ryder Cup
20th century in Lancashire